This is a list of butterflies of the Marshall Islands.

Hesperiidae

Coeliadinae
Badamia exclamationis  (Fabricius, 1775)

Lycaenidae

Polyommatinae
Lampides boeticus  (Linnaeus, 1767)

Nymphalidae

Danainae
Danaus plexippus plexippus  (Linnaeus, 1758)

Nymphalinae
Hypolimnas bolina rarik  von Eschscholtz, 1821
Junonia villida villida  (Fabricius, 1787)

References
W.John Tennent: A checklist of the butterflies of Melanesia, Micronesia, Polynesia and some adjacent areas. Zootaxa 1178: 1-209 (21 Apr. 2006)

'
Marshall
Marshall Islands
butterflies
Marshall Islands
'Marshall Islands